The Tanimbar bush warbler (Horornis carolinae) is a species of bird in the family Cettiidae.
It is found in Yamdena.
Its natural habitat is subtropical or tropical moist lowland forest.
It is threatened by habitat loss.

References

Tanimbar bush warbler
Birds of the Tanimbar Islands
Tanimbar bush warbler
Taxonomy articles created by Polbot